Shen Yunpu (1916–1991) was a People's Republic of China politician. He was born in Yanggu County, Shandong. He was CPPCC Committee Chairman of Guizhou.

1916 births
1991 deaths
People's Republic of China politicians from Shandong
Chinese Communist Party politicians from Shandong
Political office-holders in Guizhou
Delegates to the 1st National People's Congress
Delegates to the 7th National People's Congress
People from Yanggu County, Shandong
Vice-governors of Guizhou